Bruce Gray (September 7, 1936 – December 13, 2017) was a Canadian actor, known for multiple roles in films and television shows for over 5 decades.

Early Years

Gray was born in Puerto Rico and lived in Toronto after 1949. He graduated from Humberside Collegiate and from the University of Toronto with a Master's in Psychology. While at the University of Toronto, he was an active member of Phi Delta Theta fraternity.

Acting career
Following a small role in the 1966 film Adulterous Affair, Gray worked steadily from 1978 onwards, appearing in both Canadian and American-based film and television productions.

He may be best known to Canadian audiences for his four seasons as investment banker Adam Cunningham on the Global series Traders (1996-2000). He also gained attention as the father of the groom in My Big Fat Greek Wedding, the recurring role of Judge J.E. Reilly on the television serial Passions and the ghost of Joe's father on the television show Medium.

Gray appeared in a number of science fiction themed productions. He portrayed Sky Marshall Dienes in the movie version of Starship Troopers, an interrogator of Captain John Sheridan on Babylon 5, Vulcan philosopher Surak on Star Trek: Enterprise. He appeared several times on Star Trek: The Next Generation and Star Trek: Deep Space Nine as Admiral Chekote.

He appeared on a number of soap operas and serials. Two important roles were that of Wyatt Coles on All My Children (playing the husband in a child-abusing couple) and on The Edge of Night (on which he played Owen Madison, the husband of Kim Hunter).

He also had a guest-starring role on the cable television series Queer as Folk, playing gay millionaire George Schickel.

Gray was the face of the leader of a fictitious anti-Amsterdam organization in a print and internet advertising campaign for Amstel beer.

Death
Gray died of cancer on December 13, 2017 at the age of 81.

Filmography

Film

Television

See also

List of Puerto Ricans

References

External links

1936 births
2017 deaths
American emigrants to Canada
Canadian male television actors
Canadian male film actors
Canadian male voice actors
Male actors from Toronto
Male actors from San Juan, Puerto Rico
Best Actor in a Drama Series Canadian Screen Award winners
Deaths from brain cancer in the United States
Deaths from cancer in California
Neurological disease deaths in California
University of Toronto alumni
Puerto Rican emigrants to Canada
20th-century Canadian actors